Kronprinsen som försvann (eng. "The Crown Prince who disappeared") is the 2022 Sveriges Television's Christmas Calendar (SVT). This years outside shots were filmed on location in Gotland and Hungary, as well as a studio in Stockholm.

Plot 
In a Kingdom far up north, a Crown Prince named Carl Wilhelm is in danger of his life and forced to escape from the royal castle when his mother, Queen Lovisa, suddenly disappears. While he is hiding, he meets a girl named Hilda. She helps him to hide by establishing him as an orphanage boy named Ville.

Roles 
 Kerstin Linden – the poor girl Hilda
 Xavier Canca-Englund – crown prince Carl Wilhelm Gyllencrona / the poor boy Ville
 Arvin Kananian – the fool Amir, friend of the crown prince
 Dilan Gwyn – queen Lovisa
 Anton Lundqvist – Lieutenant Silverdufva
 Maria Lundqvist – Nanni, Hildas grandmother
 Valter Toverud – little brother
 Dag Malmberg – general Leijongap
 Sissela Benn – chamber maid
 Alva Bratt – the duchess Augustina, the crown prince's cousin
 Magnus Sundberg – Rask
 Christoffer Nordenrot –  Frisk
 Sissela Kyle – the national judge
 Joel Spira – Torsten
 Alejandra Goic Albornoz – Maria
 Jonatan Rodriguez – Edward
 Torbjörn Averås Skorup – servant
 Rozbeh Ganjali – guard captain
 Rojan Telo – guard
 Tina Pour Davoy – antique dealer
 Annika Hallin – lunch guest
 Lennart Jähkel – Storyteller

References

External links 
 
 

Sveriges Television's Christmas calendar